Jean-Pierre Bergeret (1751–1813) was a French botanist. He was born on 25 November 1751, in Lasseube (Béarn), and died on 28 March 1813, in Paris. He was the author of the following:
 Phytonomatotechnie universelle, c'est-à-dire, l'art de donner aux plantes des noms tirés de leurs caractères, 1783–84.
 Flore des Basses-Pyrénées, 1803 (with Eugène Bergeret; Gaston Bergeret) – Flora of Basses-Pyrénées.

References 

1752 births
1813 deaths
People from Béarn
18th-century French botanists
19th-century French botanists